The 1874 North Northumberland by-election was fought on 17 March 1874.  The byelection was fought due to the incumbent Conservative MP, Earl Percy, becoming Treasurer of the Household.  It was retained by the incumbent.

References

1874 elections in the United Kingdom
1874 in England
19th century in Northumberland
By-elections to the Parliament of the United Kingdom in Northumberland constituencies
Unopposed ministerial by-elections to the Parliament of the United Kingdom in English constituencies
March 1874 events